Charles Alexandre Louis Graux (4 January 1837 – 22 January 1910) was a Belgian lawyer, professor at the Universite Libre de Bruxelles, and a liberal politician.

He co-founded La Liberté and the Ligue de l'Enseignement, and was the director of La Discussion.

He was Belgium's Minister of Finance from 1879 to 1884.
He was a member of Belgium's Chamber of Representatives from 1890 to 1894.
He was made a Minister of State in 1900.

See also
 Liberal Party

References

Sources
 Liberal Archive

1837 births
1910 deaths
Belgian Ministers of State
Finance ministers of Belgium